Margaret Mary Burgoyne-Howse Scrivener (c. 1922 – September 11, 1997) was a politician in Ontario, Canada.  She was a Progressive Conservative Party member of the Legislative Assembly of Ontario from 1971 to 1985 who represented the downtown Toronto riding of St. David. She was the second woman in Canada to hold a cabinet position, serving as a minister in the government of Bill Davis.

Background
Scrivener was born in Toronto and was educated at St. Mildred's-Lightbourn School. She worked for the Toronto Telegram newspaper during and after World War II, and covered Marilyn Bell's historic swims across Lake Ontario. She was also active in several Rosedale community groups, and was a prominent figure in the struggle to preserve the ravines from development. She served as chair of the Ontario Planning Association, and was a member of the Metropolitan Toronto Planning Board. From 1962 to 1970, she and her husband owned a 120-hectare dairy farm near Keswick, Ontario.

Scrivener was a skilled pianist and listed Mozart and Chopin as being among her favourite composers.  She died in 1997, at age 75.

Politics
In the 1971 provincial election she ran as the Progressive Conservative in the downtown Toronto riding of St. David. She defeated NDP candidate Giles Endicott by 2,603 votes.  She was diagnosed with breast cancer before entering the legislature, but did not share this information with her colleagues. She served as a backbench supporter of Bill Davis's government, and was named a parliamentary assistant in 1974. She was re-elected in 1975 by a smaller margin over NDP contender Jim Lemon and Liberal candidate June Rowlands. On October 7, 1975 she was appointed to cabinet by Premier Bill Davis as Minister of Government Services. After a cabinet shuffle on February 3, 1977, she was named Minister of Revenue.

In the 1977 provincial election, Scrivener defeated New Democratic Party challenger Gordon Cressy by 836 votes.  She was dropped from cabinet on January 21, 1978, and spent the remainder of her legislative career as a backbencher. In the 1981 provincial election, she defeated future Liberal Attorney-General Ian Scott by 1,022 votes.

She did not campaign in the 1985 election. Shortly before his official retirement as premier, Davis appointed Scrivener as chair of the Criminal Injuries Compensation Board.  Although many considered her to be a moderate Tory, in January 1985 Scrivener endorsed Frank Miller as a candidate to succeed Davis as the leader of the Progressive Conservative party.

Cabinet positions

References

External links

1922 births
1997 deaths
Women government ministers of Canada
Members of the Executive Council of Ontario
Politicians from Toronto
Progressive Conservative Party of Ontario MPPs
Women MPPs in Ontario
20th-century Canadian women politicians